Nil satis nisi optimum ("Nothing but the best is good enough") is a Latin phrase which has been used as the motto of the following:

967 Squadron of the Air Training Corps
Everton FC
Carlton le Willows Academy
Clifton Hunter High School
Escondido Charter High School
John D. O'Bryant School of Mathematics & Science
Loughborough University
Okehampton College
Proviso East High School
Rutlish School
St Francis of Assisi Catholic College
Strathcona-Tweedsmuir School
Westerford High School
Priory Dental Centre

References

Latin words and phrases